Jacob Gils is a Danish contemporary art photographer known for his work in a multiple exposure technique called "Movement". His work has been shown in numerous exhibitions, art fairs and museums around the world.

Early life

Jacob Gils was born in Gentofte, Denmark in an artist family. His mother is the painter Merete Hansen, and his father was the painter Ove Gils.

Jacob Gils graduated from the Copenhagen School of Photography in 1989, where he assisted the Danish photographer Leif Schiller. In his early career he worked as a commercial photographer and founded the prestigious photo studio Gils Fotografi. In 2001 he transitioned to a fine art practice and started to experiment with different techniques and expressions of photography.

Awards
 2015 Px3 Prix de la photographie Paris in the category "Fine Art Nudes"
 2012 Px3 Prix de la photographie Paris in the category "Fine Art Altered Images"

Work

Movement

Gils' Movement series started as an experiment and eventually became a creative work. Myriam Simons, from le revenue claims that his photography is something new and full of creativity because he paints with his camera. Fredrik Haren, "The Creativity Explorer", called this for his experience exploring about human creativity and writer about the subject, talked about the balance between Gils' "curious research mode" and the "focused execution mode".

Limit to your love

The series Limit to your love is Gils' nude experiment with a Polaroid camera. He has won two awards with this series. Virginie Lorient from Bettina Von Arnim's Gallery asserts that the transfers of colours of this technique may vary, but Gils does not modify the natural colours.

Transfer

In the transfer serie, Gils transfers polaroids onto watercolour paper. Through this innovated technique, the eye begins to decode, and to see more than a simple picture.

Articles
 Le Revenu
 The art couch.
 Switch Magazine
 Gente di Fotografia
 Gente di Fotografia
 Gente di Fotografia
 The eye of photography
 Bo Bedre. Erick Rimmer
 Interview to The creativity Explorer. Fredrik Hansen

Permanent exhibitions
 Stockholm: Fotografiska Museum of Photography
 Norway: The National Museum of Photography Oslo
 Bogotá: Museum of Modern Art MAMBO
 Copenhagen: The Danish National Museum of Photography
 China: Nanjing Institute of Visual Arts
 Beijing: Danish Cultural Institute in Beijing
 Boston: Boston Properties offices
 Copenhagen: LEGO A/S
 Copenhagen: TRH Crown Prince Frederik and Crown Princess Mary Palace
 Milan: Loro Piana Collection
 Copenhagen: Maersk A/S
 Shanghai: Thomas Shao Collection

Gallery

References

External links
 www.gils.dk
 www.artsy.net 

20th-century Danish photographers
21st-century Danish photographers
Danish photographers
Living people
Landscape photographers
Portrait photographers
Year of birth missing (living people)
People from Gentofte Municipality